Commesse (Orders) is an Italian television comedy drama series directed by Giorgio Capitani and broadcast by Rai 1 between 1999 and 2002.

Cast 
 Sabrina Ferilli: Marta De Santis
 Nancy Brilli: Roberta Ardenzi
 Veronica Pivetti: Fiorenza
 Franco Castellano: Romeo
 Caterina Vertova: Francesca Carraro
 Anna Valle: Paola
 Elodie Treccani: Lucia Manca
 Lorenzo Ciompi: Dottor Livata
 Giacomo Piperno: Dante, padre di Fiorenza
 Giuliana Calandra: Anna, madre di Fiorenza
 Rodolfo Bigotti: Giancarlo De Santis, marito di Marta
 Massimo Ciavarro: Architetto Riccardo Jesi 
 Gigliola Cinquetti: Clara Massimi
 Ray Lovelock: Luca Massimi
 Caterina Deregibus: Elisa (season 2)
 Marco Bonini: Tommaso (season 2)
 Massimo Ghini: Avvocato Giovanni Minardi (season 2)
 Cesare Bocci: Gianni, fidanzato di Fiorenza (season 2)

See also
List of Italian television series

External links
 

Italian television series
RAI original programming